Syriac Assembly Movement (Arabic: حركة تجمع السريان) formerly known as the Syriac Independent Gathering Movement (Arabic: Harakat Tajammu al-Suryan al-Mustaqill) is a political party in Iraq. Its membership comprises mostly Christians, who belong to Syriac Orthodox and Syriac Catholic communities in that country. On several occasions, SAM cooperated with some other minority parties, mainly on issues related to protection of ethnic and religious rights of minority groups in Iraq. SAM headquarters are in Baghdida. Chairman of SAM is Anwar Matti Hadaya.

SAM participated in the 2009 Nineveh governorate election, as a member of the Ishtar Patriotic List, and secured a seat in the Nineveh Governorate Council. In 2017, SAM joined with other Christian minority parties in formulating a comprehensive political platform on the creation of a new governorate in the region of Nineveh Plains.

See also

References

Sources

External  links
 MP Caro visits the Syriac Assembly Movement (2012)

Political parties of minorities in Iraq
Assyrian political parties
Assyrians in Iraq
Syriac Christianity